Abdel Kader Sylla (born 10 April 1990), is a Seychellois professional basketball player. He is known as being the first professional player from the Seychelles. He currently plays for Hermine Nantes of the LNB Pro B.

Sylla joined Hermine Nantes in 2019 and averaged 5.7 points, 4.6 rebounds and 2.3 assists per game. He re-signed with the team on 11 June 2020.

He represented the Seychelles national basketball team on several occasions. In 2022, he was invited to meet President Wavel Ramkalawan.

References

External links
 Eurobasket.com Profile
 NBADraft.net profile
 EuroLeague.net Profile
 Abdel SYLLA BASKET BALL PLAYER @ SLUC Nancy Youtube.com Video

1990 births
Living people
AS Monaco Basket players
Centers (basketball)
Orléans Loiret Basket players
People from Greater Victoria, Seychelles
Seychellois men's basketball players